Thomas Lloyd (1716–1805) was an Irish politician. He served in the Irish House of Commons as the member of Parliament for Tralee between 1777 and 1783.

References

1716 births
1805 deaths
18th-century Anglo-Irish people
Irish MPs 1776–1783
Members of the Parliament of Ireland (pre-1801) for County Kerry constituencies